The 5th Vuelta a España (Tour of Spain), a long-distance bicycle stage race and one of the three grand tours, was held from 10 to 31 May 1945. There was also a classification sponsored by Pirelli, Rodríguez also won the points classification and Julián Berrendero won the mountains classification.

Teams and riders

Route

Points classification
A new introduction to this Vuelta was a classification on points, sponsored by Pirelli. It was calculated as follows:
The winner of a stage received 100 points, the second 99, and so on. If cyclists arrived in a group that was given the same time, they all received the same number of points.
The first five cyclists in a stage received 12 points for every minute that they arrived ahead of the number six of the stage.
For every point scored for the mountains classification, two points were given for this points classification.
On intermediate sprints, points could be won: 8 for the winner, 6 for the second, 4 and 2 for the next.

Although the sponsor said that the classification was a great success, it did not return the next edition.

Final standings

General classification

Mountain classification

Points classification

Other awards
There was also a team competition: the ranks in the general classification of the best two cyclists per cycling club were added, and the club with the lowest total won. Delio Rodríguez was in the same club as Alejandro Fombellida, and because they finished first and ninth, they scored 10 points; no other team had fewer points, so they won the team competition.

References

 
1945
1945 in Spanish sport
1945 in road cycling